Carinodrillia lachrymosa is a species of sea snail, a marine gastropod mollusk in the family Pseudomelatomidae, the turrids and allies.

Description

Distribution
This species occurs in the Pacific Ocean from Mexico to Panama.

References

 McLean, J.H. & Poorman, R. (1971) New species of tropical Eastern Pacific Turridae. The Veliger, 14, 89–113
 McLean, J. H. "A revised classification of the family Turridae, with the proposal of new subfamilies, genera, and subgenera from the eastern Pacific." The Veliger 14.1 (1971): 114–130.

External links
 
 

lachrymosa
Gastropods described in 1971